Agnieszka Radwańska was the defending champion, but lost in the quarterfinals to Alison Riske.

Unseeded Kateřina Siniaková won her first WTA singles title, defeating Riske in the final, 6–3, 6–4.

Seeds

Draw

Finals

Top half

Bottom half

Qualifying

Seeds

Qualifiers

Lucky loser

Qualifying draw

First qualifier

Second qualifier

Third qualifier

Fourth qualifier

References
 Main draw
 Qualifying draw

WTA Shenzhen Open
2017 Singles